Taj-ol-Dowleh-ye Muziraj (also Romanized as Tāj-ol Dowleh-ye Mūzīraj; also known as Tāj-od Dowleh) is a village in Karipey Rural District, Lalehabad District, Babol County, Mazandaran Province, Iran. At the 2006 census, its population was 134, in 33 families.

References 

Populated places in Babol County